Jerson Tegete (born 7 October 1988) is a Tanzanian footballer who currently plays for Alliance Academy and formerly the Tanzania national football team.

He appeared in 2 of the 3 qualification matches for the 2010 FIFA World Cup scoring 2 goals.

References
 

1988 births
Living people
Tanzanian footballers
Tanzania international footballers
Young Africans S.C. players
Mwadui United F.C. players
Maji Maji F.C. players
Kagera Sugar F.C. players
Association football forwards
Tanzanian Premier League players
Tanzania A' international footballers
2009 African Nations Championship players